Houghton High School is a high school in Houghton, Michigan. It is located in Michigan's Upper Peninsula. Houghton High School and Houghton Middle School share a building.

History
Three high schools predate the current building, all located on the same site in downtown Houghton. The Houghton School, also called the Rock School for its external appearance, was built before 1881. The Portage Lake High School was built to replace the undersized Rock School, but was gutted by fire in 1921. A replacement, Houghton High School, was completed in 1924.

The current building was constructed in 1989 up the hill from the previous site. The Portage Lake High School was demolished in 1999. An addition was approved in 2008 and completed by 2010 that included a second gym, band room, and various energy efficiency upgrades.

Demographics 
The demographic breakdown of Houghton's 479 students enrolled in 2021–22 was:

 Male – 54.1%
 Female – 45.9%
 Asian – 4.4%
 Black – 0.4%
 Hispanic – 1.0%
 White – 91.9%
 Two or more races – 2.3%

Additionally, 97 students (20.25%) were eligible for reduced-price or free lunch.

Athletics
The Houghton Gremlins compete in the West-PAC conference. The school colors are orange and black. The following Michigan High School Athletic Association (MHSAA) sanctioned sports are offered:

Baseball (boys) 
Basketball (boys and girls) 
Girls state champion - 2005
Boys state champion - 1955
Cross country (boys and girls) 
Boys UP champion - 2007, 2011, 2017
Girls UP champion - 2020, 2021
football (boys) 
Golf (boys and girls) 
Gymnastics (girls) 
Ice hockey (boys) 
State champion - 1982
Skiing (boys and girls) 
Girls state champion - 2010, 2018
Softball (girls) 
Swim and dive (boys and girls) 
Girls UP champion - 1985, 1998, 1999, 2000, 2001, 2013, 2017
Boys UP champion - 2011, 2012, 2018, 2019
Track and field (boys and girls) 
Volleyball (girls)

References

External links

Public high schools in Michigan
Schools in Houghton County, Michigan
Buildings and structures in Houghton, Michigan
1881 establishments in Michigan